Loote is an American pop duo based in New York City consisting of Jackson Foote and Emma Lov Block. They released their debut single, "High Without Your Love", in May 2017 through Island Records.

Background
Block's career began by writing jingles for commercials and children's television networks. By age 13, she was performing her songs at the Bitter End, on Bleecker Street, the oldest rock and roll club in New York City.  In college, she met Foote in a writing class, and the two began writing songs together. In 2015, they signed to Universal Music Publishing Group through a joint venture with SRP as Loote. Their remix of Shawn Mendes' song "Mercy" was released on November 4, 2016. They co-wrote and produced "No Promises" by Cheat Codes and Demi Lovato, released in March 2017.

The duo released their debut single "High Without Your Love" in May 2017 through Island Records. The song peaked at No. 23 on Billboards Spotify Velocity chart. Loote released an acoustic version of the song on May 26, 2017. The music video for "High Without Your Love" was released on July 31, 2017 to Loote's YouTube channel. The duo was featured in Martin Jensen's single "Wait", released August 18, 2017.

Loote's second single "Out of My Head" was released on September 8, 2017. Their third single, "Your Side of the Bed", was released on March 9, 2018. "Your Side of the Bed" was used as a backing track to BTS' "G.C.F in Osaka", published on April 30, 2018. On May 25, 2018, they released their fourth single, "Longer Than I Thought", featuring Joe Jonas. They released their debut EP Single (stylized as single.) on June 15, 2018. Their non-album single "Runaway" featuring Korean singer Eric Nam released on May 18, 2019. They released the single "tomorrow tonight" on May 16, 2019. On January 31, 2020, they released "Wasted Summer" with teamwork. and John K. On April 24, they released the Heart Eyes EP. They are managed by Russell Kaplan and Joseph Pineda.

Discography

EPs

Singles

As lead artists

As featured artists

Remixes

Writing and production credits

References

External links
 Official website

 Loote on IslandRecords.com

American pop music duos
Musical groups established in 2015
Island Records artists
2015 establishments in New York City